Catch Me Out Philippines is a 2021 Philippine television reality talent competition show broadcast by GMA Network. The show is based on the British version of the same name. Hosted by Jose Manalo, it premiered on February 6, 2021 on the network's Sabado Star Power sa Gabi line up. The show concluded on September 4, 2021.

Format

Every week, two amateur performers will undergo training for a month under their mentors to master a certain skill. After which, each of them will perform alongside professional performers in front of ten celebrity catchers, including the show's regular celebrity spotters, Derrick Monasterio and Kakai Bautista.

At the end of episode, the impostor who managed to trick the most members of the show's celebrity catchers will be hailed as the winner and will be tagged as the episode's Great Pretender.

Cast
Host
 Jose Manalo

Judges
 Derrick Monasterio
 Kakai Bautista

References

External links
 
 

2021 Philippine television series debuts
2021 Philippine television series endings
Filipino-language television shows
GMA Network original programming
Philippine reality television series
Philippine television series based on British television series